The 2006 United States House of Representatives elections in Colorado were held on November 7, 2006, with all seven House seats up for election.  The winners served from January 3, 2007 to January 3, 2009.

Overview

District 1

Opposed by no Republican candidate, incumbent Democratic Congresswoman Diana DeGette easily won a fifth term over Green Party candidate Thomas D. Kelly.

District 2

Incumbent Democratic Congressman Mark Udall dispatched with Republican nominee Rich Mancuso, Libertarian nominee Norm Olsen, and Green candidate J. A. Calhoun to win a fifth term in this Boulder-based district.

District 3

Incumbent Democratic Congressman John Salazar, the brother of Senator Ken Salazar, won a second term in this conservative, west Colorado district over Republican nominee and Colorado State Representative Scott Tipton and Libertarian nomine Bert Sargent.

District 4

Emerging from surprisingly narrow wins in this conservative, east Colorado-based district, incumbent Republican Congresswoman Marilyn Musgrave thinly edged out the Democratic nominee, Colorado State Representative Angie Paccione and Reform Party candidate Eric Eidsness, who garnered an impressive 11.28% of the vote.

District 5

Incumbent Republican Congressman Joel Hefley declined to seek an eleventh term, creating an open seat in this conservative district based in Colorado Springs and its suburbs. Emerging from a particularly nasty and bitterly fought primary, Republican nominee Doug Lamborn, a Colorado State Senator, was not endorsed by the retiring Hefley.

On August 29, 2006, Hefley expressed anger that his successor was not his top aide, Jeff Crank. Commenting on the primary campaign, Hefley said, "I spent eight years trying to get rid of the sleaze factor in Congress. [...] It's not something I can do to help put more sleaze factor in Congress." Hefley was incensed at tactics such as a mailed brochure from the Christian Coalition of Colorado associating Crank with "public support for members and efforts of the homosexual agenda." Hefley said that he "suspected, but couldn't prove, collusion between Lamborn's campaign, which is managed by Jon Hotaling, and the Christian Coalition of Colorado, which is run by Hotaling's brother, Mark." Hefley called it "one of the sleaziest, most dishonest campaigns I've seen in a long time," and refused to endorse Lamborn.

Despite this setback, Lamborn ultimately defeated Democratic nominee Jay Fawcett, a retired Air Force Lieutenant Colonel.

District 6

Incumbent Republican Congressman Tom Tancredo, well known for his staunchly conservative, anti-illegal immigration views, faced off against Democratic nominee Bill Winter, a lawyer and former legislative aide to Senator John McCain, albeit by a smaller margin than Tancredo is used to in this solidly conservative district based in the Denver suburbs.

District 7

When incumbent Republican Congressman Bob Beauprez declined to seek a third term so that he could run for Governor, this district emerged as a top pick-up opportunity for House Democrats. Former Colorado State Senator Ed Perlmutter, the Democratic nominee, defeated the Republican nominee, Rick O'Donnell, Green Party nominee Dave Chandler, and Constitution Party nominee Roger McCarville by a solid margin.

References

Colorado

2006
2006 Colorado elections